The 1963 Titleholders Championship was the 24th Titleholders Championship, held April 25–29 at Augusta Country Club in Augusta, Georgia. Two-time defending champion Mickey Wright came from three strokes back on Sunday to tie Marilynn Smith and force the second consecutive playoff at the event.

Tied after nine holes in the 18-hole playoff on Monday, Smith fell three strokes behind, then Wright double-bogeyed the par-3 14th and Smith birdied the 16th to tie. It was the first of two consecutive wins in the championship for Smith, age 34, which were her only two major titles.

Wright was the 36-hole leader at 146 (+2), a stroke ahead of Smith.

Final leaderboard
Sunday, April 28, 1963

Source:

Playoff
Monday, April 29, 1963

Source:

References

Titleholders Championship
Golf in Georgia (U.S. state)
Titleholders Championship
Titleholders Championship
Titleholders Championship
Titleholders Championship
Women's sports in Georgia (U.S. state)